Uncle Kent is a 2011 American film directed by Joe Swanberg and written by Kent Osborne and Swanberg. The film stars Osborne in the titular role of Kent, and Jennifer Prediger, Josephine Decker, Kevin Bewersdof, and Swanberg. The film premiered at the Sundance Film Festival and was released through video on demand, the same day on January 21, 2011.

Synopsis
Kent Osborne is a forty-year-old single animator who meets Kate, a New York journalist, through Chatroulette. Kate accepts Kent's invitation to visit L.A. for the weekend. Kate reveals that her heart belongs to another man. Frustrated, Kent attempts to make sense of the situation.

Cast 
 Kent Osborne as  Kent
 Jennifer Prediger as Kate
 Josephine Decker as Josephine
 Joe Swanberg as Joe
 Kevin Bewersdorf as Kev

Release
on December 2, 2010, it was announced IFC Films had acquired all distribution rights to the film. The film premiered at the Sundance Film Festival and was released through video on demand on January 21, 2011. The film was then selected to screen at the Stockholm International Film Festival on November 9, 2011.

Sequel
A sequel to the film titled Uncle Kent 2, written by Kent Osborne and directed by Todd Rohal, had its world premiere at SXSW on March 13, 2015. The film's distribution rights were acquired by Factory25. The film had a limited release in 2016, and was also made available through video on demand that year.

References

External links 

American independent films
2011 films
Films directed by Joe Swanberg
Mumblecore films
2010s English-language films
2010s American films